"Rock My Life" is a song by the German singer Jeanette. The song was written by Frank Johnes, Bodybrain and Wonderbra, and produced by Johnes and Tom Remm for her third album Rock My Life (2002). It was released as the album's leading single on October 14, 2002 in German-speaking Europe. Her highest-peaking single to date, it reached number three in Germany and peaked at number six in Austria and Switzerland, respectively. "Rock My Life" was certified gold by the Bundesverband Musikindustrie (BVMI), for 300.000 Copies. The Single sold more than 400.000 Copies in Europe.

Formats and track listings
These are the formats and track listings of major single releases of "Rock My Life".

Maxi CD single
(065942218; Released )
"Rock My Life" (Radio edit) – 3:55
"Rock My Life" (Rock version) – 4:54
"Rock My Life" (Instrumental) – 3:55
"Jeanette the Hit Edit" – 4:13
"Rock My Life" music video out-takes

CD single
(0659062; Released )
"Rock My Life" (Radio edit) – 3:55
"Rock My Life" (Rock version) – 4:54

Charts

Weekly charts

Year-end charts

Certifications and sales

References

External links
Official website

2002 singles
Jeanette Biedermann songs
2002 songs
Polydor Records singles
Songs written by Kristina Bach